Pradeep Shukla is an Indian politician and a member of 18th Legislative Assembly of Uttar Pradesh representing Sahajanwa. He is a member of the Bharatiya Janata Party.

Personal life
Shukla was born to Satyadev and hails from Gorakhpur city of Uttar Pradesh. He completed his graduation from Shri Guru Ji Golanalkar School Khorabar, Gorakhpur in 2005 and is a businessperson.

Political career
As a Bharatiya Janata Party candidate from Sahajanwa in the 2022 Uttar Pradesh Legislative Assembly election, Shukla received 105,981 votes, defeating rival Yashpal Singh Rawat of Samajwadi Party and succeeding party member Sheetal Pandey in the process.

References

1980s births
Living people
Bharatiya Janata Party politicians from Uttar Pradesh
Uttar Pradesh MLAs 2022–2027
People from Gorakhpur